is a private junior college in Moroyama, Saitama, Japan, established in 1989.

External links
  

Japanese junior colleges
Educational institutions established in 1989
Private universities and colleges in Japan
Universities and colleges in Saitama Prefecture
1989 establishments in Japan